The Biola Media Conference, held annually at Biola University, is a conference for Christian media professionals working in the mainstream media.

Speakers

Speakers at the conference have included Scott Derickson, Ralph Winter, Craig Detweiler, and Mark Zoradi.

References

Christian conferences
Biola University